Barış Esen (born November 3, 1986) is a Turkish chess grandmaster. As of the July 2013 FIDE rating list, he is ranked among active players number 369 in the world and number five in Turkey. He earned FIDE titles as International Master (IM) in 2005 and Grand Master (GM) on July 25, 2010.

He was born on November 3, 1986. He began chess playing early in his childhood in the late 1990s. Azerbaijani International Master Fikret Sideifzade, whom he met during a chess competition in Antalya, taught him the chess basics.

After his success at the Angora Tournament held in Konya, Turkey in 2010, he was named Grand Master, earning this title as the youngest and the fourth Turkish chess player.

Upon his result of 7½/11 at the European Individual Chess Championship held in Aix-les-Bains, France in 2011, Barış Esen qualified as the only participant of his country at the Chess World Cup 2011 in Khanty-Mansiysk, Russia. He lost in the first round to Olexandr Moiseenko from Ukraine with ½–1½.

Personal life
Esen is married to Nesibe Esen. The couple has a son Emin, who was born on October 7, 2010. He is a resident of Adana.

Achievements
 2009 Thessaloniki Open, Greece – 2nd
 2009 Angora Tournament, Turkey – 1st
 2010 Thessaloniki Open, Greece – 2nd

References

External links
Barış Esen at chessgames.com

Living people
1986 births
Sportspeople from Adana
Turkish chess players
Chess grandmasters